Charles Frederick Peterson (12 February 1920 – 15 October 1965) was an Australian rules footballer who played with North Melbourne in the Victorian Football League (VFL).

Notes

External links 

1920 births
1965 deaths
Australian rules footballers from Victoria (Australia)
North Melbourne Football Club players